The 1991 State of the Union Address was given by the 41st president of the United States, George H. W. Bush, on January 29, 1991, at 9:00 p.m. EST, in the chamber of the United States House of Representatives to the 102nd United States Congress. It was Bush's second State of the Union Address and his third speech to a joint session of the United States Congress. Presiding over this joint session was the House speaker, Tom Foley, accompanied by Dan Quayle, the vice president, in his capacity as the president of the Senate.

The speech lasted approximately 48 minutes. and contained 3823 words.

The Democratic Party response was delivered by Senator George Mitchell (ME).

Manuel Lujan, the Secretary of the Interior, served as the designated survivor.

References

External links
 (full transcript), The American Presidency Project, UC Santa Barbara.
 1991 State of the Union Address (video) at C-SPAN
 1991 State of the Union Response (transcript)
 1991 State of the Union Response (video) at C-SPAN
 Full video and audio, Miller Center of Public Affairs, University of Virginia.

State of the Union addresses
State Union 1991
102nd United States Congress
State of the Union Address
State of the Union Address
State of the Union Address
State of the Union Address
January 1991 events in the United States